Kilian Walch (born 24 January 1997) is an Austrian bobsledder. He competed in the two-man event at the 2018 Winter Olympics.

References

External links
 

1997 births
Living people
Austrian male bobsledders
Olympic bobsledders of Austria
Bobsledders at the 2018 Winter Olympics
Place of birth missing (living people)